The Genghis Khan Equestrian Statue, part of the Genghis Khan Statue Complex, is a  tall, stainless steel statue of Genghis Khan on horseback and the world's tallest equestrian statue. It is located on the bank of the Tuul River at Tsonjin Boldog, 54 km (33.55 mi) east of the Mongolian capital Ulaanbaatar, where, according to legend, he found a golden whip. The statue is symbolically pointed east towards his birthplace. It was designed by sculptor D. Erdenebileg and architect J. Enkhjargal and erected in 2008.

Visitors walk to the head of the horse through its chest and neck, where they have a panoramic view. The main statue area will be surrounded by 200 ger (yurts), designed and arranged like the pattern of the horse brand marks that were used by the 13th century Mongol tribes. The cost of the complex is reported to be US$4.1 million, built by The Genco Tour Bureau, a Mongolian company.

The attached museum has exhibitions relating to the Bronze Age and Xiongnu archaeological cultures in Mongolia, which show everyday utensils, belt buckles, knives, sacred animals, etc. and a second exhibition on the Great Khan period in the 13 and 14th centuries which has ancient tools, goldsmith subjects and some Nestorian crosses and rosaries.


Gallery

See also

 List of tallest statues

References

External links

 More pictures and information at Kuriositas
 Climb to the Genghis Khan Monument

Cultural depictions of Genghis Khan
Equestrian statues in Mongolia
Colossal statues
Statues of monarchs
Statues of military officers
2008 sculptures
Monuments and memorials in Mongolia